Bim's Paradise English School is a privately run school which is based in Thane, India. It is run by Excelssior Education Society. The school was established in 1979 by Mr & Mrs Khanna. The school is affiliated to the Maharashtra State Board of Secondary and Higher Secondary Education and runs classes from KG to XIIth Standard.

History
The school began operations in 1979 run by Mr & Mrs Khanna in Tembhi Naka area of Thane City and continued to run in this location for the next 11 years, after which it was shifted to the new complex in Mithbunder Road in Kopri, Thane East. The first batch Secondary School Certificate students passed out in 1991. In the mid nineties the school also got approval to operate at junior college level.

References

High schools and secondary schools in Maharashtra
Schools in Thane district
Educational institutions established in 1979
1979 establishments in Maharashtra